Zsolt Nagy may refer to:

 , Hungarian actor, in Kontroll and many other films
 Zsolt Nagy (footballer, born 1979), Hungarian footballer
 Zsolt Nagy (footballer, born 1993), Hungarian footballer
 Zsolt Nagy (politician) (born 1971), Romanian politician